István Csók (13 February 1865, Sáregres – 1 February 1961) was a Hungarian Impressionist painter. Csok lived and exhibited in Paris for a portion of his life. He became most famous in Hungary for his nudes, portraits, and landscapes of the Lake Balaton. Csok had many international exhibitions in such cities as Rome, San Francisco, Pittsburgh, and London. He won the Kossuth Prize twice.

Though rarely seen in the West nowadays, an example of Csók's work can be glimpsed behind the opening credits of the 1971 film Countess Dracula. This is an 1896 painting showing serial killer Countess Elizabeth Bathory enjoying the torture of some young women: in an inner courtyard of one of her castles, naked girls are being drenched with water and allowed to freeze to death in the snow. The original painting was destroyed in World War II.

External links
Works by István Csók 
ArtNet Biography

1865 births
1961 deaths
People from Fejér County
Recipients of the Kossuth Prize
Hungarian University of Fine Arts
19th-century Hungarian painters
20th-century Hungarian painters
Hungarian male painters
19th-century Hungarian male artists
20th-century Hungarian male artists